The 2022 Rose of Tralee was the 61st edition of the annual Irish international festival held on 22–23 August 2022. The competition was televised live on RTÉ television.
This was the first Rose of Tralee festival since 2019 due to the COVID-19 pandemic in the Republic of Ireland.
This was also the first year to be held at the Kerry Sports Academy at Munster Technological University in Tralee. 

The Westmeath Rose, 24-year-old Rachel Duffy  was named as the 2022 International Rose of Tralee.

References

External links
Official Site

Rose of Tralee
Rose of Tralee
Rose of Tralee